Edwin J. Orford  (5 December 1911 – 1986), also known by the nickname of "Sandy", was a Welsh professional wrestler of the 1940s and 1950s, wrestling trainer of the 1950s and 1960s, and professional rugby league footballer who played in the 1920s, 1930s and 1940s.

Background
Sandy Orford's birth was regsietered in Pontypool district, Wales, and he died aged .

Playing career

International honours
Sandy Orford won 4 caps for Wales in 1939–1944 while at Wakefield Trinity.

County Cup Final appearances
Sandy Orford played left-, i.e. number 11, in Wakefield Trinity's 9-12 defeat by Featherstone Rovers in the 1940 Yorkshire County Cup Final during the 1939–40 season at Odsal Stadium, Bradford on Saturday 22 June 1940.

Other notable matches
Sandy Orford played left- for a Rugby League XIII against Northern Command XIII at Thrum Hall, Halifax on Saturday 21 March 1942.

Club career
Bradford Northern beat Dewsbury in the Championship play-off semi-final during the 1942–43 season. However, Dewsbury's manager, Eddie Waring, appealed to the Rugby Football League, claiming that Bradford Northern had fielded Wakefield Trinity's Sandy Orford as a guest player, and that Orford was ineligible because prior to the semi-final, he had played only three league matches for Bradford Northern, rather than the regulatory minimum of four league matches, the semi-final actually being Orford's fourth league match. Bradford Northern was disqualified, and Dewsbury went on to a 33-16 aggregate victory over Halifax in the Championship Final. However, a month later, Bradford appealed to the Rugby Football League, claiming that Dewsbury had fielded Castleford's Frank Smith as a guest player, and that Smith was ineligible because prior to the semi-final, he had played only three league matches for Dewsbury, rather than the regulatory minimum of four league matches, though he had played in a number of cup matches. Bradford Northern's appeal was upheld and the Rugby Football League Council fined Dewsbury £100 (based on increases in average earnings, this would be approximately £11,780 in 2013), stripped them of the Championship title, and declared the Championship during the 1942–43 season void.

Professional wrestling
Sandy Orford became a professional wrestler during the 1940s, fighting 6-time world champion Lou Thesz on three occasions, with one draw and two losses, and defeating Shirley Crabtree (later known as "Big Daddy") on Crabtree's début by two falls to one at St James' Hall, Newcastle on Saturday 14 June 1952, he appeared as a masked wrestler, first as the Black Angel and latterly as The Mask, he also trained Shirley Crabtree, and Colin Williamson.

Genealogical information
Sandy Orford is the father of the professional wrestler Tony Orford.

References

External links
Sandy Orford at wrestlingheritage.co.uk
'A Legend In Our Midst' at wrestlingheritage.co.uk
Greetings, Grapple Fans: Big Daddy

1911 births
1986 deaths
Bradford Bulls players
Dewsbury Rams players
People from Crumlin, Caerphilly
Rugby league players from Caerphilly County Borough
Rugby league players from Pontypool
Rugby league second-rows
Rugby League XIII players
Sportspeople from Caerphilly
Wakefield Trinity players
Wales national rugby league team players
Welsh male professional wrestlers
Welsh rugby league players